Mika Juhani Salo (born 30 November 1966) is a Finnish former professional racing driver. His best ranking was 10th in the world championship in 1999, when he stood in for the injured Michael Schumacher at Ferrari for six races, scoring two podiums and contributing to Ferrari's constructors' championship win. He also won the GT2 class in the 2008 and 2009 24 Hours of Le Mans.

Career

Formula Three and Japanese racing
In 1989, Helsinki-born Salo competed in the British Formula 3 Championship, racing for Alan Docking Racing. He raced with the Reynard Alfa Romeo package which was not the season's best. Staying with Alan Docking Racing for 1990 and moving to a more competitive Ralt chassis, he raced against countryman and fierce rival Mika Häkkinen in Formula Three, finishing second to him.
In 1990, Salo was caught driving under the influence in London.

Formula One

1994–1998: Lotus, Tyrrell and Arrows

After a few years racing in Japan he made his first Formula One start at the penultimate round of the  season in Japan for the ailing Lotus team. He was kept on for the season's finale in Australia. He was to spend three years with the team, scoring points several times. In the 1997 Monaco Grand Prix he completed the whole (rain-shortened and -slowed) race without refuelling, taking fifth place ahead of the faster Giancarlo Fisichella as a result.

1999: British American Racing and Ferrari

Following an injury to BAR driver Ricardo Zonta, Salo took his place for three races whilst the Brazilian recovered. BAR's first season was not successful but Salo scored their best result of the year, with a seventh-place finish at San Marino. However a greater opportunity arose when Michael Schumacher broke his leg in a crash during the 1999 British Grand Prix. Salo was selected as his substitute to partner Eddie Irvine at Ferrari. In his second race in Ferrari at the 1999 German Grand Prix Salo led for part of the race and would have scored a Grand Prix win but team orders demanded that he give the lead to Irvine, who at the time was fighting for the championship with Mika Häkkinen. Following the race, Irvine handed his victory trophy over to Salo as a gesture of gratitude. He also finished third at Monza, ahead of Irvine. These podium finishes were critical in helping Ferrari win their first Constructors' title since .

2000–2002: Sauber and Toyota
He scored two points for Toyota in their first season, becoming the first driver since JJ Lehto at the 1993 South African Grand Prix to score points on a team's debut by finishing sixth at the 2002 Australian Grand Prix. He retired from Formula One at the end of 2002, after surprisingly getting fired from Toyota (though it was later revealed that he was not on good terms with the team due to his deemed poor performance).

During his Formula One career, he achieved two podiums, and scored a total of 33 championship points.

Post-Formula One
His first post-Formula One race came at the 2003 12 Hours of Sebring, driving the UK-entered Audi R8, the same car he was due to race at the 24 Hours of Le Mans if it had not run out of fuel already after the first hour. He raced in four CART races for PK Racing during the same year, his best finish being third in Miami in his second series start.

Because of his strong links with Ferrari he was picked up to be part of the development program of the Maserati MC12 GT racer. He made his FIA GT debut in 2004, narrowly losing the 24 Hours of Spa-Francorchamps in a Ferrari 575. After that he entered the last four races of the season in the Maserati, winning two races and finishing second once.

2005 was a year somewhat lost in the doldrums with only two participations with the Maserati MC12 in the ALMS GTS-class, a competition where the car turned out to be not even half as competitive as in the FIA GT series.

For 2006, Salo returned to racing full-time, signing with AF Corse in the FIA GT to drive the Ferrari F430 and later on in the year with Risi Competizione in the ALMS. He was victorious in class in the 24 Hours of Spa and finished third in the FIA GT2 Drivers' Championship with 61 points, while his efforts in the ALMS contributed to Risi's Teams' Championship cup.
In the following year he continued with Risi Competizione in the ALMS and took the GT2 class honours in the 12 Hours of Sebring and the championship along with teammate Jaime Melo. They won a total of eight races out of twelve in the class. In addition, he won the RAC Tourist Trophy with Thomas Biagi when substituting for Michael Bartels, driving a Maserati MC12 once more.

Salo and Melo with Risi Competizione earned the first team At-Large honours on the 2007 All-American Racing Team, as voted for by the American Auto Racing Writers and Broadcasters (AARWBA).
Salo raced again in the ALMS for Risi Competizione in 2008. Although he was not successful in defending his previous year's titles, he won the GT2 class in the 24 Hours of Le Mans, coming in 18th overall.

In 2009, he joined the Risi Ferrari team at the blue-riband races only, the 12 Hours of Sebring, the 24 Hours of Le Mans and the Petit Le Mans event, winning all three of them. Having won these enduro races all more than once, Salo felt he was ready for a new challenge. He set his mind on NASCAR, and had his first test with Michael Waltrip Racing at the half-mile New Smyrna Speedway in November 2009.

In 2010–12, Salo competed in the Gold Coast 600, an endurance event for the V8 Supercars. In 2010, he partnered with Walkinshaw Racing's Andrew Thompson and retired from both races. For 2011–12 he raced with Will Davison and the Ford Performance Racing team, finishing 2nd in the 1st race of 2011 and winning the 2nd race in 2012.

In 2014, driving for Maranello Motorsport, Salo co-drove a Ferrari 458 Italia GT3 to victory at the Bathurst 12 Hour alongside Australian motor racing legends Craig Lowndes and John Bowe, and another local Australian driver Peter Edwards.

Personal
Salo lives in Estonia, and has a son named Max and a daughter with his wife Noriko. His godson Jesse Krohn competes in the IMSA SportsCar Championship. Like fellow Finns Keke Rosberg and JJ Lehto, both former Formula One drivers, Salo has commentated on several F1 races on MTV3 and the pay-channel C More MAX since 2005. Since 2011, Salo has been hosting the Finnish TV-show, Virittäjät ('Test Drive by Mika Salo'), along with his former co-host Tomi Tuominen, who is a Finnish journalist, television presenter, sports commentator and former co-driver in the World Rally Championship.

In 2013, Salo featured in Discovery channel's program called Driven to Extremes along with Hollywood actors Tom Hardy and Adrien Brody. Salo appeared in two episodes, one with Tom Hardy in minus 50 degrees Celsius in Russia, and the other one with Adrien Brody to the Malaysian jungle at the height of the monsoon season.

Helmet
Salo's helmet was originally dark blue with a white halo on the top (with a red line inside), 2 white stripes (with a red line inside) going from the rear going down diagonally to the sides of the helmet and a white trapezoidal shape on the chin area (with blue outline), slightly based on Prost's helmet. When he raced in Formula One, he changed the helmet from dark blue to sky blue with the rest of the elements intact.

Racing record

Career summary

† Not eligible for championship points.

‡ Team standings.

Complete British Formula 3 results
(key) (Races in bold indicate pole position) (Races in italics indicate fastest lap)

Complete Japanese Formula 3000 Championship results
(key) (Races in bold indicate pole position) (Races in italics indicate fastest lap)

Complete Formula One results
(key)

Complete CART results
(key)

† Cancelled due to California Fires

24 Hours of Le Mans results

Complete American Le Mans Series results

Complete GT1 World Championship results

Complete V8 Supercar results

† Not Eligible for points

Complete International Superstars Series results
(key) (Races in bold indicate pole position) (Races in italics indicate fastest lap)

Bathurst 12 Hour results

Complete European Le Mans Series results

Complete FIA World Endurance Championship results

References

1966 births
Living people
Sportspeople from Helsinki
Finnish racing drivers
Finnish Formula One drivers
Team Lotus Formula One drivers
Tyrrell Formula One drivers
Arrows Formula One drivers
BAR Formula One drivers
Ferrari Formula One drivers
Sauber Formula One drivers
Toyota Formula One drivers
British Formula Three Championship drivers
Champ Car drivers
Japanese Formula 3000 Championship drivers
FIA GT Championship drivers
American Le Mans Series drivers
24 Hours of Le Mans drivers
Supercars Championship drivers
Finnish expatriate sportspeople in Japan
Finnish expatriates in Monaco
Finnish expatriate sportspeople in the United Kingdom
Finnish expatriate sportspeople in the United States
FIA GT1 World Championship drivers
Superstars Series drivers
Blancpain Endurance Series drivers
ADAC GT Masters drivers
European Le Mans Series drivers
24 Hours of Daytona drivers
WeatherTech SportsCar Championship drivers
24 Hours of Spa drivers
Finnish expatriates in Estonia
Russian Circuit Racing Series drivers
SMP Racing drivers
AF Corse drivers
Arena Motorsport drivers
Alan Docking Racing drivers
KV Racing Technology drivers
Nürburgring 24 Hours drivers